Nunzia is a female Italian given name. Notable people with the name include:
Nunzia Agata Pometti (born 1955), Italian actress
Nunzia Catalfo (born 1967), Italian politician
Nunzia De Girolamo (born 1975), Italian lawyer and politician

See also
Nunzio, male equivalent

Feminine given names
Italian feminine given names